Karen Poole is an English songwriter and singer based in London.

Biography
Born in Chadwell Heath, London, she is the daughter of 1960s vocalist Brian Poole, the lead singer of the Tremeloes. Poole is the founding member (with her sister Shelly Poole) of Alisha's Attic, an English pop duo of the 1990s and early 2000s. The band had substantial success in the United Kingdom and Europe, and produced three albums including the platinum selling Alisha Rules the World.

Ivor Novello and twice Brit Awards nominated Poole has achieved more than 30 Top 20 UK hit singles as a songwriter, having written hits for prominent artists including Kylie Minogue, Becky Hill, David Guetta, Lily Allen, Sugababes, NCT, Giorgio Moroder, Red Velvet, Exo, WayV, Twice, Joel Corry, Tiësto, Alesso, Zara Larsson, Galantis, The Shapeshifters and many others.

In 2021, Poole was awarded Best Music Creative at the  Music Week Women in Music awards. She co-wrote for the musical Bridget Jones' Diary in 2015, in collaboration with Lily Allen and Greg Kurstin.

Selected composition credits

References

External links

Living people
English women songwriters
People from Chadwell Heath
Singers from London
20th-century English women singers
21st-century English women singers